The 1992 Volta a la Comunitat Valenciana was the 50th edition of the Volta a la Comunitat Valenciana road cycling stage race, which was held from 18 February to 23 February 1992. The race started in Jávea and finished in Valencia. The race was won by Melcior Mauri of the  team.

General classification

References

Volta a la Comunitat Valenciana
Volta a la Comunitat Valenciana
Volta a la Comunitat Valenciana
Volta a la Comunitat Valenciana